Dolichoderus jiaoyanshanensis is an extinct species of ant in the genus Dolichoderus. Fossils containing the species were found in China, and it was described by Hong in 1985. The ant is from Shanwang and is presumed to be a Miocene insect.

References

†
Miocene insects
Fossil taxa described in 1989
†
Fossil ant taxa